Bid-e Kabkan (also Romanized as Bīd-e Kabkān and Bīd Kabgān) is a village in Neh Rural District, in the Central District of Nehbandan County, South Khorasan Province, Iran. At the 2006 census, its population was 19, in 4 families.

References 

Populated places in Nehbandan County